Aorounga is an eroded meteorite impact crater in Chad, Africa.

Description 
An outer and an inner ring (11 and 7 km, respectively) rise about 100 m above the mean level of the surrounding plain (see topographic map). Both aforementioned rings are separated by a relatively flat depression of uniform width. A possible central hill, maybe an uplift structure, of 1.5 km is almost centrally located in the depression.

The crater is accompanied by two nearby circular features revealed by Space Shuttle SIR-C radar. These may be related impact craters, and if correct, Aorounga may be part of a crater chain. On the assumption that this hypothesis is correct, the exposed Aorounga crater is sometimes referred to as Aorounga South. The central highland, or peak, of the crater is surrounded by a small sand-filled trough; this in turn is surrounded by a larger circular trough. Linear rock ridges alternating with light orange sand deposits cross the image from upper left to lower right; these are called yardangs by geomorphologists. Yardangs form by wind erosion of exposed rock layers in a unidirectional wind field. The wind blows from the north-east at Aorounga, and sand dunes formed between the yardangs are actively migrating to the south-west.

See also 
 List of impact craters in Africa
 Gweni-Fada crater

References

Further reading 
 Becq-Giraudon, J. -F., Rouzeau, O., Goachet, E. and Solages,S., Meteoritic impact origin of the annular depression of Aorounga, Chad (Africa). C. R. Acad. Sci. Paris, t. 315, série II, p. 83-88. 1992
 Koeberl, C., African meteorite impact craters: Characteristics and geological importance. Journal of African Earth Sciences, v. 18, pp. 263–295. 1994
 Koeberl, C., Reimold, W.U., Vincent, P. M., Brandt,D., Aorounga and Gweni Fada Impact Structures, Chad, Central Afr.: Petrology and Geochemistry of Target Rocks, LPSC XXIX, Lunar and Planetary Institute, Houston, TX, (CD-ROM). 1998
 McHone J.F., Greeley, R., More impact and impact-like structures on the SIR-C radar; Europe, Africa, and Arabian Peninsula (abstract). Lunar and Planetary Science XXVIII, pp. 915–916. 1997
 Miallier, D., Sanzelle, S., Falgueres, C., Fain, J., Pilleyre, Th. And Vincent,P.M., TL and ESR of quartz from the astrobleme of Aorounga (Sahara of Chad), Quaternary Science Reviews, Vol 16 (3-5), pp. 265–274. 1997
 Ocampo, A. C., Pope, K. O., Shuttle Imaging Radar (SIR-C) Images Reveal Multiple Impact Craters at Aorounga, Northern Chad, 27th Lunar and Planetary Science Conference. 1996
 Vincent, P. M., Beauvilain, A., Boudeulle, M. and Moutaye,A.H., The astrobleme of Aorounga (Sahara of Tchad): Preliminary structural data (abstract). European Science Foundation, Third International Workshop. Shock Wave Behaviour of Solids in Nature and Experiments, Limoges, France. 1994

External links 
 Description and exclusive pictures in the field by Alain Beauvilain

Impact craters of Chad
Carboniferous impact craters
Carboniferous Africa
Borkou Region